The Los Angeles Consular Corps (LACC) is an informal organization made up of the international consulates located in Los Angeles, California.

The Consular Corps promotes positive diplomatic relationships between the 105 countries that maintain consulates in Los Angeles through regular meetings, luncheons, special events, and publicizing national days which celebrate various independence days and holidays in member nations. LACC also hosts monthly luncheons and events that allow various Consuls to engage with the culture of Los Angeles and share their home countries' culture as well.

Los Angeles has the second largest consular community in the world, after New York City, with 105 countries currently maintaining a consulate in the city of Los Angeles. The majority of these consulates have jurisdiction over the regions of Southern California, while some serve the entire state of California, and other parts of the Western United States.

Location of consulates

The majority of the Consulates in Los Angeles are located in the Wilshire corridor, throughout West L.A., Beverly Hills, and Koreatown. Some consulates are located as far west as Brentwood while a number of consulates are centered in Downtown Los Angeles.

Several consulates are also located in the nearby cities of Glendale (Armenia) and Santa Monica (New Zealand and Uruguay), immediately adjacent to the City of Los Angeles.

Leadership
As of September 2022, leadership of the Los Angeles Consular Corps was as follows:

 Acting Dean: Grant Arthur Gochin of Togo

 Second Vice Dean: Jaak Treiman of Estonia

 Secretary: Mame Toucouleur Mbaye of Senegal

 Treasurer: Franco Zimmerli of Switzerland

 Members at Large:

 Ruben Eduardo Caro of Argentina

 Ahmed Mohamed Osman Shaheen of Egypt

 Stefan F. M. Schneider of Germany

 Hillel Newman of Israel

 Juris Bunkis of Latvia

 Abdelhak Saoud of Morocco

Government relationships

The government offices responsible for dealing with the foreign consulates in Los Angeles are:
The Los Angeles County Office of Protocol
The City of Los Angeles Office of Protocol, in Mayor Karen Bass' office.
International Trade Office, Office of the Mayor of Los Angeles
The International Protocol Office of Governor Gavin Newsom
The U.S. Department of State office in Los Angeles (11000 Wilshire Blvd.)

LACC Membership 
The Los Angeles Consular Corps includes representatives from over 100 nations, including the following countries:

Armenia
Azerbaijan
Canada
China
Israel
Lebanon
Mexico
Saudi Arabia
South Korea
Spain
Togo
Thailand

Additionally, the Los Angeles Consular Corps includes foreign trade missions, foreign commercial offices:
The Trade Office of Taiwan in Los Angeles 
The Brazilian Chamber of Commerce of California
The Trade Council of Spain
The Danish Business Council
Québec Government Offices - Los Angeles and Silicon Valley 

 See here for a full list of diplomatic missions in Los Angeles

Los Angeles Global Importance

In terms of international affairs, Los Angeles is particularly unique because it is neither a national capital (or even a state capital), nor headquarters for a major international organization such as the UN, nor a major financial center (such as Sydney, Shanghai, and Frankfurt) and still has attracted over one hundred foreign consulates. While New York City is home to the United Nations and thus a formal presence from every world country, Los Angeles represents a global cultural hub and thus the international community voluntarily chooses to locate consulates throughout the city.

Los Angeles offers an important and strategic location: being inside the United States, in the major state of California, and at the crossroads of both Asia and Latin America.  Its location on the Pacific Rim makes it an obvious choice for most countries to locate its consulate.  Also, Los Angeles boasts one of the busiest major airports in the world: LAX, also the Port of Los Angeles is the largest maritime port in the United States, and North America, and is the 4th largest in the world.  Los Angeles is the largest city in California, and the second largest in the U.S., and is the world's capital for entertainment.  Many factors make Los Angeles an important place on the global stage. The Los Angeles customs district is the largest in the U.S. in terms of international trade capital and volume.

Demographically, Los Angeles is one of the most ethnically diverse regions in the world.  With nearly 300 languages spoken, and the largest communities of Koreans, Armenians, Persians, Filipinos, Taiwanese, Guatemalans, Mexicans, and Canadians outside their respective countries of origin, L.A. is a cosmopolitan and international melting pot.

References

External links 
Los Angeles Consular Corps (LACC), official site

 
Organizations based in Los Angeles